AJPA is an abbreviation that may refer to:

 Asian Journal of Public Affairs
 American Jewish Press Association
 American Journal of Physical Anthropology